Philip II in Armour is a portrait of Philip II of Spain by Titian, painted in 1551 when they were both in Augsburg.

Philip II
1551 paintings
Paintings by Titian in the Museo del Prado
Portraits of monarchs
Philip II of Spain